Whitaker's Chapel is a historic chapel in Enfield, Halifax County, North Carolina. The chapel was originally an Anglican chapel, but was later used by Methodists. It was built about 1828, and is a transitional Federal / Greek Revival style frame building. The original section measures 26 feet by 36 feet.  It was moved to its present site in 1880–1881, and a vestibule and chancel extension were added sometime after.  The chapel was restored in 1965.  The adjacent church cemetery was established in the 1850s.

It was listed on the National Register of Historic Places in 1997.

References

Methodist churches in North Carolina
Former Anglican churches
Chapels in the United States
Former churches in North Carolina
Churches on the National Register of Historic Places in North Carolina
Federal architecture in North Carolina
Greek Revival church buildings in North Carolina
Gothic Revival church buildings in North Carolina
Churches completed in 1828
19th-century Episcopal church buildings
Churches in Halifax County, North Carolina
National Register of Historic Places in Halifax County, North Carolina
19th-century churches in the United States